The Ambassador (Italian: L'ambasciatore) is a 1936 Italian historical comedy film directed by Baldassarre Negroni and starring Leda Gloria, Luisa Ferida and Maurizio D'Ancora.

It was shot at the Safa Palatino Studios in Rome.

Cast
Leda Gloria as Marchesa di Savignano
Luisa Ferida as Isabella de Quevedo
Maurizio D'Ancora as Lelio Di Santelmo
Cesare Zoppetti as ambasciatore di Spagna
Enzo Biliotti as ambasciatore di Sassonia
Romolo Costa as Duca Paolo
Achille Majeroni as Granduca di Modena
Vasco Creti as segretario del Duca
Oreste Bilancia
 Rosanna Schettina
 Tina Lattanzi
 Rosetta Calavetta

References

Bibliography
 Roberto Chiti & Roberto Poppi. I film: Tutti i film italiani dal 1930 al 1944. Gremese Editore, 2005.

External links

1936 films
1930s Italian-language films
Films directed by Baldassarre Negroni
Films set in the 18th century
Italian historical comedy films
1930s historical comedy films
Italian black-and-white films
Films based on works by Eugène Scribe
Italian films based on plays
Films shot at Palatino Studios
1930s Italian films